Woodstock Diary is a live album recorded at the Woodstock Festival in 1969. It was released in 1994, at the same time as the 4-CD box set Woodstock: Three Days of Peace and Music, but contains some tracks not available on the box set.

Track listing
 Joe Cocker – "Let's Go Get Stoned" – 5:30
 The Band – "The Weight" – 4:30
 Johnny Winter – "Mean Town Blues" – 4:20
 Crosby, Stills, & Nash – "Blackbird" – 2:35
 Janis Joplin – "Try (Just a Little Bit Harder)" – 4:15
 Janis Joplin – "Ball and Chain" – 6:14
 Richie Havens – "I Can't Make It Anymore" – 3:50
 Jefferson Airplane – "Somebody to Love" – 4:00
 Jefferson Airplane – "White Rabbit" – 2:25
 Tim Hardin – "If I Were a Carpenter" – 2:35
 Mountain – "Southbound Train" – 3:30
 Sly and the Family Stone – "Love City" – 6:21
 Joe Cocker – "I Shall Be Released" – 5:50
 Jimi Hendrix – "Voodoo Child (Slight Return)" – 12:10

References

1994 live albums
1994 compilation albums
Live rock albums
Rock compilation albums
Atlantic Records compilation albums
Atlantic Records live albums
Woodstock Festival